Chaavu Kaburu Challaga is a 2021 Indian Telugu-language romantic comedy-drama film written and directed by Peggalapati Koushik and produced by Bunny Vasu and Allu Aravind under GA2 Pictures. The film stars Kartikeya and Lavanya Tripathi with Murali Sharma, Aamani, and Rajitha play supporting roles. The film was released on 19 March 2021.

Plot
Basthi Balaraju is a funeral vehicle driver in Vizag and he lives with his mother, Gangamma, and his bed ridden father. One day he is called to take Peter's body to the cemetery. When he goes to Peter's house he sees Mallika and later on he finds out that Peter was Mallika's husband. However, Balaraju does not care and decides to love Mallika. He tries to make Mallika move on with her life and to choose him as her new husband and this causes trouble with Mallika's father-in-law, Sekhar Samuel. In the process he finds that his mother is having an affair with Mohan who loves Balaraju's mother for long time but Gangamma never accepted his love and they decided to stay as friends. After an altercation with Mohan, Balaraju understands the feelings of his mother by speaking to her about this affair. He then learns that his mother wants a person to share her feelings as her husband has been bed ridden since Balaraju's birth. Balaraju changes as he never thought about her feelings. Balaraju then decides to get Gangamma and Mohan married and at the same time Mallika reciprocates his feelings also. Everything goes smoothly but then Mallika gets a marriage proposal and she has to tell Balaraju that she has to marry another man. She then finds Balaraju at the hospital but at the same time Gangamma is admitted into the hospital after she was in an accident. Due to high blood loss, Gangamma dies and Balaraju slips into depression. Mohan then takes up the role and takes care of both Balaraju and his father and Balaraju works at his mother's corn stand in the beach. Later prior to Mallika's marriage, Balaraju decides to meet with Sekhar and tries to tell him about how much he loves Mallika. During the wedding Sekhar realizes and stops the marriage. Sekhar then finds Balaraju and gets him married to Mallika.

Cast

Production 
The film was announced in December 2019. The principal photography of the film was started in late 2019. Later that year due to COVID-19 pandemic, the film was delayed. Filming was resumed in October 2020. Music is composed by Malayalam film composer Jakes Bejoy who previously composed for Taxiwaala (2018) in Telugu.

Soundtrack 

The soundtrack was released through Aditya Music.

Release 
Chaavu Kaburu Challaga was released theatrically on 19 March 2021. The film began streaming on Aha from 23 April 2021.

Reception 
Y. Sunitha Chowdhary of The Hindu wrote that despite a promising storyline, the film could not make a mark. A reviewer from The Hans India felt that director took up a challenging story but faltered in execution. They appreciated the performance of Karthikeya and opined that Tripathi got a novel character. The New Indian Express critic Gabbeta Ranjith Kumar wrote his review on a positive note, praising the storyline and performances.

The Times of India journalist Neesthi Nyayapati opined that the film's noble thought did not translate well, and wrote: "Chaavu Kaburu Challaga dares to go where few films would – show that a woman’s life does not have to end, begin and revolve around her family. If only the film was surefooted enough to deliver that message."

References

External links 
 

2021 films
Geetha Arts films
2021 romantic comedy films
Indian romantic comedy-drama films
Films scored by Jakes Bejoy
2020s Telugu-language films
Films set in Visakhapatnam
Films shot in Visakhapatnam
Films set in Andhra Pradesh
Films shot in Andhra Pradesh
2021 comedy-drama films
2021 romantic drama films